Amanda Nicole Ventrice (born September 12, 1985), better known by her stage name Mandy Ventrice, is an American recording artist, songwriter, and vocal producer.

Born in the Bay Area, Mandy Ventrice began her music career at a very early age; writing her first song at the age of seven, and completing her first CD independently by the age of thirteen. Soon after, Ventrice joined a female pop group based out of Boston, called Poetry In Motion. In 2002, the pop group dispersed and Mandy launched new solo efforts, working with the likes of Shep Goodman & Kenny Gioia, Aaron Accetta, Carl Sturken & Evan Rogers, and Sam Hollander.

After moving to New York in 2004, Mandy began performing with rock trio, Lights Resolve; touring with The Used, Shiny Toy Guns, and Panic! at the Disco; and performing at major music festivals, including The Bamboozle and CMJ.

In 2010, she released her first dance/pop single with American house DJ and multi-platinum recording artist Ian Carey. After the song and video's massive exposure, reaching over 1.6 million views on YouTube, she released a single with one of Germany's top DJ duos, Michael Mind Project. The single charted on top 40 radio and the DJ dance charts in Europe. In the midst of her overseas success, Mandy moved back to California and worked with hip-hop producer Just Blaze on a new track for Eminem’s highly anticipated studio album, Recovery. She performed the lead vocal on the track’s hook, but the song wasn’t completed in time for the official release of the album in June 2010. Less than one month later, Mandy performed sample vocals on a Kanye West production for Rick Ross’ single, "Live Fast Die Young," off Ross' fourth studio album, Teflon Don. She also performed background vocals for R&B legend Charlie Wilson on his number one single, “You Are,” and on the massively successful Watch The Throne album with Jay-Z and Kanye West.

In January 2013, Mandy moved to Los Angeles to focus more on her career in songwriting. She began co-writing with some of the industry's top writers and producers such as, Julia Michaels, Chris Sernel, Breyan Isaac, and Kevin Kadish. She has songs featured in major motion pictures such as Jackass Presents: Bad Grandpa, and prime time television shows such as ABC's The Mindy Project, as well as MTV's Teen Mom and Jersey Shore. In December 2013, she inked her first major publishing deal with Atlantic Records and Warner/Chappell Music.

Mandy currently lives in the Bay Area, where she continues to write for major and independent artists, as well as for the TV/film industry.

Collaborations

Songwriting discography

References

External links 
 Official Website
 Official Youtube Page

1985 births
American women singer-songwriters
American women pop singers
Living people
Singer-songwriters from California
21st-century American women singers
21st-century American singers